Rhytidiadelphus is a genus of mosses belonging to the family Hylocomiaceae.

The genus was first described by Karl Gustav Limpricht in 1906.

The genus has cosmopolitan distribution.

Species:
 Rhytidiadelphus japonicus T. Koponen, 1971
 Rhytidiadelphus loreus Warnstorf, 1906
 Rhytidiadelphus printzii Kaalaas, 1919
 Rhytidiadelphus squarrosus Warnstorf, 1906
 Rhytidiadelphus triquetrus Warnstorf, 1906

References

Moss genera
Hypnales